Matthew Levy may refer to:

 Matt Levy, Australian Paralympic swimmer
 Matthew Levy (politician), American politician from Mississippi
 Matthew N. Levy, American physiologist